John Rorke (9 June 1807 – 13 August 1896) was an Irish-born merchant and political figure in Newfoundland. He represented Carbonear in the Newfoundland and Labrador House of Assembly from 1863 to 1882 as a Conservative and Confederate.

He was born in Athlone and came to Newfoundland in 1824, working as a clerk for Bennett and Ridley, a fishery supply firm. In 1830, he established his own firm in Carbonear. He married Mary Toque.

In 1859, a fire destroyed most of Carbonear, including Rorke's business and home; rebuilding began in the following year, and some of the rebuilt stone buildings remain as heritage structures in Carbonear. Rorke served as a member of the Executive Council from 1879 to 1882. He died in Carbonear at the age of 89.

References

Sources
 

Members of the Newfoundland and Labrador House of Assembly
1807 births
1896 deaths
People from Athlone
Politicians from County Westmeath
People from Carbonear
Irish emigrants to pre-Confederation Newfoundland
Newfoundland Colony people
Members of the Executive Council of Newfoundland and Labrador